The 1962 season was the 57th season of competitive football in Norway.

Hovedserien 1961/62

First division reduced from 16 to 10 teams

Landsdelsserien

Group Østland/Søndre

Group Østland/Nordre

Group Sørland/Vestland, A

Group Sørland/Vestland, B

Group Sørland/Vestland, C

Group Møre

Group Trøndelag

Promotion play-off Sørland/Vestland
Haugar - Start 2-0
Start - Os 2-4
Os - Haugar 3-2

Promotion play-off Møre/Trøndelag
Kvik - Aalesund 0 - 0
Aalesund - Kvik 2 - 0 (agg. 2 - 0)

Aalesund to promotion play-off

Promotion play-off
Sarpsborg - Os 2-0
Gjøvik/Lyn - Aalesund 1-1
Os - Sarpsborg 0-3 (agg. 0-5)
Aalesund- Gjøvik/Lyn 1-2 (agg. 2-3)

Gjøvik/Lyn and Sarpsborg promoted.

Relegation play-off
Raufoss - Sparta 4-0
Sparta - Raufoss 2-2 (agg. 2-6)

Sparta relegated.

Third division

District I
 1. Askim

 2. Hafslund
 3. Sprint/Jeløy
 4. Kvik (Halden)
 5. Tune
 6. Navestad
 7. Gresvik
 8. Selbak
 9. Tistedalen
 10. Borgar

District II, group A
 1. Sagene          		(Play-off)
 ------
 2. Drafn
 3. Geithus
 4. Vestfossen
 5. Raumnes/Årnes
 6. Strømsgodset
 7. Grue
 8. Ski

District II, group B
 1. Åssiden         Play-off
 -------
 2. Drammens BK
 3. Sandaker (*)
 4. Slemmestad
 5. Kjellmyra
 6. Skiold
 7. Røa
 8. Kongsvinger

(*) Sandaker merged with Aasen to form Sandaker/Aasen

District III, group A (Oplandene)
 1. Kapp            	(Play-off)
 ----
 2. Brumunddal
 3. Redalen
 4. Fremad
 5. Moelven
 6. Gjøvik SK
 7. Hamar IL
 8. Lena

District III, group B1 (Sør-Østerdal)
 1. Nordre Trysil   	(Play-off)
 -------------
 2. Trysilgutten
 3. Nybergsund
 4. Ytre Rendal
 5. Koppang
 6. Elverum
 7. Engerdal

District III, group B2 (Nord-Østerdal)
 1. Brekken         (Play-off)
 -------
 2. Røros
 3. Folldal
 4. Tynset
 5. Nansen
 6. Tylldal
 7. Haltdalen

District III, group B3 (Sør-Gudbrandsdal)
 1. Kvam            (Play-off)
 ----
 2. Faaberg
 3. Fåvang
 4. Follebu
 5. Ringebu
 6. Vinstra

District III, group B4 (Nord-Gudbrandsdal)
 1. Sel             	(Play-off)
 ---
 2. Otta
 3. Dovre
 4. Faukstad
 5. Dombås
 6. Heidal
 7. Lesjaskog
 8. Lesja 		(withdrew)

District IV, group A (Vestfold)
 1. Runar           		(Play-off)
 -----
 2. Stag
 3. Holmestrand
 4. Tønsberg Turn
 5. Falk
 6. Tønsbergkam.
 7. Borre
 8. Flint

District IV, group B (Grenland)
 1. Skiens-Grane    		(Play-off)
 ------------
 2. Borg
 3. Urædd
 4. Kragerø
 5. Herkules
 6. Skiens BK
 7. Brevik
 8. Storm

District IV, group B (Øvre Telemark)
 1. Snøgg           		(Play-off)
 -----
 2. Rjukan
 3. Ulefoss
 4. Skade
 5. Gvarv
 6. Drangedal
 7. Kjapp

District V, group A1 (Aust-Agder)
 1. Arendals BK
 -----------
 2. Risør
 3. Rygene
 4. Tvedestrand
 5. Dristug
 6. Gjerstad 		(withdrew)

District V, group A2 (Vest-Agder)
 1. Donn
 ----
 2. Giv Akt
 3. Våg
 4. Mandalskam.
 5. Lyngdal
 6. Torridal

District V, group B1 (Rogaland)
 1. Egersund        		(Play-off)
 --------
 2. Klepp
 3. Vidar
 4. Ålgård
 5. Varhaug
 6. Sola
 7. Vaulen
 8. Sandnes AIF (Saif)

District V, group B2 (Rogaland)
 1. Djerv 1919      		(Play-off)
 ----------
 2. Nærbø
 3. Kopervik
 4. Figgjo
 5. Åkra
 6. Hinna
 7. Ganddal
 8. Torvastad

District V, group C (Sunnhordland)
 1. Odda            		(Play-off)
 ----
 2. Stord
 3. Rubbestadnes
 4. Fonna
 5. Etne

District VI, group A (Bergen)
 1. Hardy           		(Play-off)
 -----
 2. Sandviken
 3. Laksevåg
 4. Baune
 5. Fjellkameratene
 6. Nymark
 7. Bergens-Sparta

District VI, group B (Midthordland)
 1. Arna            		(Play-off)
 ----
 2. Erdal
 3. Kjøkkelvik
 4. Dale (Dalekvam)
 5. Follese
 6. Voss
 7. Florvåg

District VI, group C (Sogn og fjordane)
 1. Jotun           		(Play-off)
 -----
 2. Sogndal
 3. Sandane
 4. Høyang
 5. Måløy
 6. Eid
 7. Dale (Sunnfjord)
 8. Florø

District VII, group A (Sunnmøre)
 1. Velled./Ringen  		(Play-off)
 --------------
 2. Herd
 3. Rollon
 4. Ørsta
 5. Spjelkavik
 6. Sykkylven
 7. Aksla
 8. Volda
 9. Stordal
10. Hovdebygda
 11. Brattvåg
 12. Bergsøy

District VII, group B (Romsdal)
 1. Træff           			(Play-off)
 -----
 2. Nord-Gossen
 3. Eidsvåg (Romsdal)
 4. Åndalsnes
 5. Harøy
 6. Bryn
 7. Isfjorden
 8. Frode

District VII, group C (Nordmøre)
 1. Dahle           		(Play-off)
 -----
 2. Søya
 3. Sunndal
 4. Bjørn
 5. Todalen
 6. Framtid
 7. Bøfjord
 8. Nordlandet

District VIII, group A (Sør-Trøndelag)
 1. Orkanger        		(Play-off)
 --------
 2. Orkdal
 3. Løkken
 4. Troll
 5. Rindal
 6. Flå
 7. Svorkmo
 8. Leik

District VIII, group B (Trondheim og omegn)
 1. Nidelv          			(Play-off)
 ------
 2. Tryggkameratene
 3. Heimdal
 4. Strinda
 5. Trond
 6. Vestbyen
 7. National
 8. Wing

District VIII, group C (Fosen)
 1. Brekstad        			(Play-off)
 --------
 2. Hasselvika
 3. Opphaug
 4. Ørland Flystasjon (IØF)
 5. Fevåg
 6. Beian
 7. Bjugn 				(withdrew)

District VIII, group D (Nord-Trøndelag/Namdal)
 1. Stjørdals/Blink 			(Play-off)
 ---------------
 2. Bangsund
 3. Fram (Skatval)
 4. Neset
 5. Vikavarvet
 6. Snåsa
 7. Namsos
 8. Byafossen

District IX
 1. Bodø/Glimt
 2. Mo
 3. Brønnøysund
 4. Stålkameratene
 5. Grand
 6. Sandnessjøen

District X
 1. Mjølner
 2. Andenes
 3. Narvik/Nor
 4. Tromsø
 5. Harstad
 6. Svolvær

Play-off District II
Sagene - Åssiden 2-0
Åssiden - Sagene 1-1 (agg. 1-3)

Sagene stay up.

Play-off District III
Brekken - Nordre Trysil 3-1

Nordre Trysil relegated.

Kvam - Sel 10-3

Sel relegated.

Brekken - Kvam 2-0

Kvam relegated.

Kapp - Brekken 5-2
Brekken - Kapp 2–7 (agg. 4-12)

Kapp stay up.

Play-off District II/III
Åssiden - Brekken 5-0

Åssiden stay up, Brekken relegated.

Play-off District IV
Snøgg - Skiens-Grane 3-1
Skiens-Grane - Runar 1-4
Runar - Snøgg 6-1

Play-off District V
Egersund - Djerv 1919 2-0
Djerv 1919 - Egersund 3-4 (agg. 3-6)

Egersund stay up.

Odda - Djerv 1919 2-2
Djerv 1919 - Odda 3-0 (agg. 5-2)

Djerv 1919 stay up, Odda relegated.

Championship District V
Arendals BK - Donn 2-3
Donn - Arendals BK 3-0 (agg. 6-2)
Donn - Egersund not played

Play-off District VI
Hardy - Arna 1-0

Hardy stay up.

Arna - Jotun 0-3

Jotun stay up, Arna relegated.

Play-off District VII
Velledalen/Ringen - Dahle 0-2
Træff - Velledalen/Ringen 2-2
Dahle - Træff 3-3

Play-off District VIII
Brekstad - Nidelv 0-3
Stjørdals/Blink - Orkanger 3-0
Brekstad - Orkanger 1-4
Nidelv - Stjørdals/Blink 4-1
Stjørdals/Blink - Brekstad 2-0
Orkanger - Nidelv 0-2

Norwegian Cup

Final

Northern Norwegian Cup

Final

European Cups

Norwegian representatives
Fredrikstad (Champions Cup)

Champions Cup

First round
September 5: Fredrikststad - Vasas Budapest (Hungary) 1 - 4
September 19: Vasas Budapest - Fredrikstad 7 - 0 (agg. 11 - 1)

National team

Note: Norway's goals first 
Explanation:
ECQ = European Championship Qualifier

 
Seasons in Norwegian football